The Al-Arabiya Coalition (I'tilāf alarabiya) also known as Arabic Coalition is an Iraqi political coalition formed for the 2014 Iraqi parliamentary election by then-Deputy Prime Minister of Iraq Saleh al-Mutlaq and others parties and independent politicians.

History
For the 2013 governorate elections the coalition, then running under the name of Arab Iraqiyya, competed by itself in Anbar, Baghdad and Salah ad-Din. In the other governorates the coalition joined up with other parties, running as part of the Loyalty to Ninewa Bloc in Ninewa, as part of Iraqiyat Diyala in Diyala, and as part of Iraqiyat Babil in Babil.

Members
The following parties make up the coalition:
Iraqi National Dialogue Front – led by Saleh al-Mutlaq
Nishor (Resurrection) Iraqi Party – led by Imad Jabir Ibrahim Mohammad al-Rawi
Stability Bloc – led by Jasim Mohammad Hasan Atiyah
National Masses Alliance – led by Ahmed Abdullah al-Jabouri
Nahrain (Two Rivers) National Movement – led by Mishan Mahdi Jabar Nusaif
Gathering of the National Promise in Saladin – led by Khalid Abdullah Hussein Mohammad al-Jahara
Supreme Masses Bloc – led by Adnan Thiab Ghanim Michthab
Iraq of Civilization (The Light) – led by Talal Hussein Muhssin Ali
Muqtaderun Gathering for Peace and Building – led by Badr Mahmoud Fahal Khalil

Other politicians aligned with the coalition include Jamal Al-Karboli from al-Hal.

Electoral results

Iraqi Parliament

Governorate Councils

References

Political party alliances in Iraq